Marriage Da Garriage is a Punjabi romantic comedy film directed by Jaswinder Singh, Starring Navraj Hans, Keeya Khanna, Jaswinder Bhalla and more. Movie produced under banner 30 TY Group Productions. Marriage da garriage is debut movie of famous singer Hans Raj Hans's son Navraj Hans Film Music is given Gurmeet Singh. Marriage Da Garriage was released on 28 March 2014.

Cast

 Navraj Hans
 Keeya khanna
 Jaswinder Bhalla
 B.N. Sharma
 Shakti Kapoor
 Upasana Singh
 Razzak Khan 
 Deepak Raja
 Amritpal Chotu

References

External links
 facebook page

2014 films
Punjabi-language Indian films
2010s Punjabi-language films